Corebridge Financial is an American multinational financial services company. It provides annuities, life insurance, asset management, retirement solutions, and other services. Corebridge was formed after AIG performed a spin-off on the company via an IPO in 2022.

History
Corebridge Financial's current structure is a result of AIG spinning off the company in 2022. American General (AG) was the historical predecessor to Corebridge's assets during AG's time as a subsidiary of AIG.

Early History
The American General Insurance Company was formed on May 8, 1926 by Gus Sessions Wortham in Houston, Texas. Wortham worked for the Texas Fire Rating Board in Austin, Texas before moving to Houston in 1912. Before starting American General, he worked at his father's insurance company, John L. Wortham & Son Agency, until his death in 1924. Following his father's death, Wortham began the company in response to a Texas Commissions of Appeal that ruled that insurance companies may merge several lines of business.

In 1953, American General hired life insurance veteran Benjamin N. Woodson as president. Woodson previously served at Mutual Trust Life Insurance Company, the National Association of Life Underwriters, and various other roles. Woodson would eventually succeed Wortham as CEO of the company in 1972 where he remained until retiring in 1978.

In 1995, the company was the subject of Unitrin, Inc. v. American General Corp.. American General tendered an offer for a controlling block of shares of Unitrin. The Board of Directors of Unitrin, who held 23% of the shares, did not think the price offered was adequate and so initiated a poison pill and offered a buyback to increase their holdings to 28% of the total shares. It became the leading case on a board of directors' ability to use defensive measures, such as poison pills or buybacks, to prevent a hostile takeover.

NLT Corporation

The NLT Corporation was formed in 1900 as the National Stick and Accident Association. The Nashville, Tennessee company became one of the country's largest life insurance companies and paved the way for the merger. American General announced a hostile takeover bid for NLT. NLT made a counter-offer to buy out AGC. In 1982 AGC, which had owned Nashville rival L&C since the 1960s, prevailed. Having acquired NLT, AGC merged the former rivals over the next decade and spun off the "non-core" assets of NLT, particularly its entertainment properties. The Grand Ole Opry, Opryland theme park, WSM and fledgling cable television network The Nashville Network (TNN) were sold to what became Gaylord Entertainment Company and later on, ViacomCBS. American General would later merge into New York-based American International Group (AIG). Its division of the corporation retained the American General brand.

AIG Merger
In 2001, it was announced that American General would be getting acquired by Prudential plc in a deal worth $26.6 billion. The deal was later called off after negative Prudential shareholder reaction. After the deal failed to go through, AIG announced plans to acquire American General for $23 billion in stock. American General would continue to operate under AIG as their life insurance and retirement services subsidiary. In 2003, Old Line Life Insurance merged with American General.

IPO and Spinoff from AIG
Corebridge was formed as a result of a spin-off of AIG's retirement, life insurance, and wealth management segments. In 2020, AIG announced plans to perform the spin-off with a 2022 IPO. In July 2021, the company announced that Blackstone Group would acquire 9.9% of the new unit for $2.2 billion cash. Blackstone and AIG also entered a long-term asset management agreement for about one quarter of AIG's life and retirement portfolio, set to increase in subsequent years.

References

External links
 

Financial services companies of the United States
American International Group
American companies established in 2022
Insurance companies based in Texas
Companies based in Houston